Alectoris is a genus of partridges in the family Phasianidae, closely related to Old World quail (Coturnix and relatives), snowcocks (Tetraogallus), partridge-francolins (Pternistis), bush quail (Perdicula), and sand and see-see partridges (Ammoperdix). Members of the genus are known collectively as rock partridges (a name that also refers to one species in particular, Alectoris graeca).

Their fossils date back to the early Pleistocene, with extant representatives in southern Europe, North Africa and Arabia, and across Asia in Pakistan to Tibet and western China.

Description
These are non-migratory birds of dry, open and often hilly country. They nest in a scantily lined ground scrape laying up to 20 eggs. They feed on a wide variety of seeds and vegetation. Ants are a very important source of nutrition for the birds as are pine nuts, juniper berries and lichens.

As is typical of many galliform birds, Alectoris partridges are relatively round-bodied and small-headed. They typically have a light brown or grey back, grey breast, buff belly, and barred flanks. Several species have a whitish throat with a black border. Their specialized flank coverts give them the appearance of being more rotund than they actually are. Their legs are red, with well-developed, ball-peen hammer-like spurs. When disturbed they run very rapidly, often uphill, taking to the wing if pressed. Their wings are long and fairly sharp, shaped rather like those of ptarmigan and spruce grouse, suggesting that the birds sustain themselves in flight over substantial distances to find food. This probably occurs most often during winter.

Introduced species and hybridisation
Some members of the genus, notably the chukar and red-legged partridge, have been introduced to many locations outside their natural range; there are now established populations of chukar in western North America, Hawaii, and the South Island of New Zealand, and of red-legged partridge in the United Kingdom, the Azores, Madeira, and the Canary Islands.

The chukar readily interbreeds with the red-legged partridge and rock partridge. The practice of breeding and releasing captive-bred chukar and hybrids between chukar and red-legged partridge has been banned in the United Kingdom, as it is a threat to red-legged partridge populations.

Species
The genus contains seven species:
 Barbary partridge, Alectoris barbara
 Arabian partridge, Alectoris melanocephala
 Red-legged partridge, Alectoris rufa
 Chukar partridge, Alectoris chukar
 Rock partridge, Alectoris graeca
 Philby's partridge, Alectoris philbyi
 Przevalski's partridge, Alectoris magna

A prehistoric species, A. peii, is known from China. Another one, A. baryosefi, has been described from Early Pleistocene fossils found at El-`Ubeidiya (Jordan valley), Israel.

See also 
 Ring species

References 

 
Bird genera